The 2021 UCI Women's ProSeries is the second season of the second-tier UCI Women's ProSeries road cycling tour, which sits below the UCI Women's World Tour but above the UCI Class 1 and Class 2 races.

The 2021 season initially consisted of eight events, of which four each are one-day races (1.Pro) and stage races (2.Pro). Of these eight events, the only non-European event was the season-opening Women's Tour Down Under stage race in Australia. However, on 1 November 2020, it was cancelled due to the COVID-19 pandemic, leaving only the seven remaining European races.

The other most notable event on the calendar is the Giro Rosa stage race. Though it is usually one of the most prestigious events, it was demoted from the UCI Women's World Tour after the 2020 season, with the move being attributed to race organizers failing to provide the minimum of 45 minutes of live television coverage required for all top-tier Women's WorldTour races.

Events

Notes

References

External links 

 
UCI Women's ProSeries